Brian Virtue is an American Grammy-nominated music producer, engineer and mixer based in Los Angeles, California. Virtue has worked with artists including Jane's Addiction, Thirty Seconds to Mars, Audioslave, Deftones, Puddle of Mudd, Chevelle, Hawthorne Heights and Crazy Town. In the early 1990s, he began working in recording studios as an audio engineer which later developed into working as a producer. Virtue worked with producer Bob Ezrin on Thirty Seconds to Mars' self-titled album in 2001 and 2002, and developed into more work with Ezrin on Jane's Addiction and with Rick Rubin on Audioslave. In 2007, Virtue moved from Los Angeles to Nashville where he worked from his own studio, including recording Chevelle's Sci-Fi Crimes.  Virtue also worked on the Jane's Addiction song "Superhero" which is the opening theme to the TV show Entourage.

Selected discography

Discography references

References

Record producers from California
Living people
Year of birth missing (living people)